Racing Club Portuense is a Spanish football team based in El Puerto de Santa María, Province of Cádiz, in the autonomous community of Andalusia. Founded in 1928, dissolved in 2013 and reformed in 2017, it plays in the Tercera División Andaluza, holding home games at José del Cuvillo Stadium, with a capacity of 8,600 seats.

Season to season

12 seasons in Segunda División B
41 seasons in Tercera División

Former players
Note: this list contains players that have played at least 100 league games and/or have reached international status.
 Enrique Montero

External links
Official website 
Futbolme team profile 
Unofficial website 

Association football clubs established in 1928
1928 establishments in Spain